Frances Newton was executed in Texas in 2005 for the 1987 triple murder of her family.

Frances Newton may also refer to:

Frances E. Newton (1871–1955), English missionary who lived in Palestine until 1938
Frances Newton, Baroness Cobham (1539–1592), second wife of William Brooke, 10th Baron Cobham
Frances Newton (educator) (1865–?), American early childhood educator
Frances Newton, the pen name of Canadian writer Muriel Denison

See also
Francis Newton (disambiguation)